Yes We Can! is a Mediacorp Channel 8 Chinese New Year drama. It stars Romeo Tan, Rebecca Lim, Xu Bin, Sora Ma, Chen Liping, Chen Hanwei, Eelyn Kok and Yao Wenlong as the main casts of the series. The show aired at 9pm on weekdays and had a repeat telecast at 8am the following day.

Plot

Cast

Awards and nominations

Star Awards 2015
Yes We Can! is nominated in 5 categories. It Won 1 out of 5 awards, Best Actress.

See also
List of programmes broadcast by Mediacorp Channel 8

References

Mediacorp Chinese language programmes